H-39 may refer to:
 Hotchkiss H39, a French light tank variant developed around 1939
 , a type of battleship proposed by Nazi Germany